Nothing/Everything is the debut album recorded by pop singer-songwriter Paula Kelley.

Track listing
"Nothing/Everything"
"Two Possible Answers (The Road)"
"Everything Full"
"You Gonna Make It?"
"Nothing"
"All Request Hour"
"For Someone"
"Slug"
"Lucie"
"Girl of the Day"
"The Light Under the Door"
"Ordinary Mind"
"Showdown"

References

Paula Kelley albums
2001 debut albums